Fejervarya iskandari is a species of frog that is endemic to Java, Indonesia. It is named in honor of Djoko Iskandar, an Indonesian herpetologist. It has been recorded in Bandung and Sukabumi, West Java.

Male Fejervarya iskandari have a moderately stout body and measure  in snout–vent length. It is a locally common species living on paddy fields where it also breeds. It is not considered threatened.

References

Fejervarya
Amphibians of Indonesia
Endemic fauna of Java
Taxonomy articles created by Polbot
Amphibians described in 2001